Chebykovo (Sıbıq) is a rural locality (a village) in Urgushevsky Selsoviet, Karaidelsky District, Bashkortostan, Russia. The population was 97 as of 2010. There are 11 streets.

Geography 
Chebykovo is located 44 km southwest of Karaidel (the district's administrative centre) by road. Arkaul is the nearest rural locality.

References 

Rural localities in Karaidelsky District